Learning and Individual Differences is a quarterly peer-reviewed academic journal published by Elsevier dealing with individual differences within an educational context. It was established in 1989 and the editor-in-chief is Paul Cirino (University of Houston). According to the Journal Citation Reports, the journal has a 2020 impact factor of 3.139.

References

External links
 

Educational psychology journals
Personality journals
Elsevier academic journals
English-language journals
Intelligence journals
Differential psychology journals